Patrick Barrow (22 January 1893 – 7 May 1974) was an English cricketer. He was a left-handed batsman who played first-class cricket for Essex in the 1922 season. He was born in Plaistow and died in Adstock.

Barrow had previously played four Minor Counties Championship matches for Dorset between 1913 and 1920, but got his only opportunity for first-class cricket in the 1922 season, playing against the Combined Services. From the lower order, Barrow scored a duck in the first innings, and took just one wicket with the ball.

External links
Patrick Barrow at Cricket Archive

1893 births
1974 deaths
English cricketers
Essex cricketers
Dorset cricketers